Indonesia hosted and took part in the 2018 Asian Para Games which was held in Jakarta from 6 to 13 October 2018. The Indonesian contingent for the games consisted of 300 athletes and 125 officials. As hosts, Indonesia were targeting to place eight overall in the medal tally and aimed to win at least 16 gold medals.

Competitors

Medalists

     
|  style="text-align:left; width:78%; vertical-align:top;"|

|  style="text-align:left; width:22%; vertical-align:top;"|

See also
Indonesia at the 2018 Asian Games

References

2018
Asian Para Games
Nations at the 2018 Asian Para Games